Fatehsinghrao Prataprao Gaekwad II (2 April 1930, Baroda – 1 September 1988, Bombay) was an Indian politician, cricketer, and titular Maharaja of Baroda from 1951 until 1988. In the 26th amendment to the Constitution of India promulgated in 1971, the Government of India abolished all official symbols of princely India, including titles, privileges, and remuneration (privy purses).

Fatehsinghrao Gaekwad was born to Pratap Singh Gaekwad, the last ruling Maharaja of Baroda and his first wife, Maharani Shantadevi Sahib Gaekwad (1914–2002). He succeeded as titular Maharaja of Baroda in 1951 when his father was deposed by the Government of India.

He served in public office as a Member of Parliament for Vadodara, from 1957 to 1967, and 1971 to 1980, representing various Congress factions. In 1967 he did not contest Lok Sabha elections, and was elected to Gujarat Vidhan Sabha from Sayajiganj seat. During his tenure in Lok Sabha, he served as Parliamentary Secretary of the Defense Ministry, Minister of Health, Fisheries and Jails, Chancellor of the Maharaja Sayajirao University in Baroda, and Chairman of the Board of Governors, National Institute of Sports in 1962-63. He was also the author of the book The Palaces of India (1980).

As a cricketer, Gaekwad represented Baroda in the Ranji Trophy between 1946 and 1958 and had a highest score of 99 in his first season. He was an attacking right-handed batsman. He played against the touring teams on various occasions between 1948 and 1954. He was an expert cricket commentator in radio and was made an honorary life member by the MCC.

Gaekwad was the President of the Board of Control for Cricket in India from 1963 to 1966, after serving as Vice-President from 1959 to 1960 and again in 1962-63. He was the manager of the Baroda Cricket Association from 1960. Known in England as "Jackie Baroda", he managed the Indian tour of England in 1959 and of Pakistan in 1978-79 and 1982-83. He still holds the record of being the youngest president of BCCI.

He died in the Breach Candy Hospital in Bombay on 1 September 1988 at the age of fifty-eight, to be succeeded as titular Maharaja of Baroda by his younger brother, Ranjitsinhrao Gaekwad.

Notes

Obituary in Indian Cricket 1988

External links

 
 
 Indian Princely States : Genealogy of the rulers of Baroda

1930 births
1988 deaths
Indian cricketers
Indian cricket administrators
Indian cricket commentators
Baroda cricketers
West Zone cricketers
People from Vadodara
Maharajas of Vadodara
India MPs 1957–1962
India MPs 1962–1967
India MPs 1971–1977
India MPs 1977–1979
Maharaja Sayajirao University of Baroda alumni
Pretenders
Lok Sabha members from Gujarat
Presidents of the Board of Control for Cricket in India
Indian National Congress politicians from Gujarat
Indian National Congress (Organisation) politicians